The 2012–13 Spartan South Midlands Football League season (known as the 2012–13 Molten Spartan South Midlands Football League for sponsorship reasons) was the 16th in the history of Spartan South Midlands Football League a football competition in England.

Premier Division

The Premier Division featured 20 clubs which competed in the division last season, along with two clubs promoted from Division One:

Ampthill Town
London Colney

For this season only, the FA were to promote a second club from two of the following six Step 5 leagues: Combined Counties League, Eastern Counties League, Essex Senior League, Kent League, Spartan South Midlands League and the Sussex County League. This was to fulfil the expansion of the Isthmian League Divisions One North and South from 22 to 24 clubs each.  The two clubs were to be promoted on a points per game basis, and the two runners-up with the best PPG were VCD Athletic (Kent Football League) and Guernsey (Combined Counties League). Three others – Aylesbury United (Spartan South Midlands League), Redhill (Sussex County League) and Barkingside (Essex Senior League) – were also confirmed as promoted by the FA on 17 May, due to resignations and non-promotions elsewhere.

From this league, only AFC Dunstable, Aylesbury United, Dunstable Town, Haringey Borough, Oxhey Jets and Tring Athletic applied for promotion.

League table

Results

Division One

Division One featured 18 clubs which competed in the division last season, along with three new clubs:

Codicote, joined from the Herts County League
Southall, joined from the Middlesex County League
Winslow United, promoted from Division Two

League table

Results

Division Two

Division Two featured eleven clubs which competed in the division last season, along with three new clubs:
Aylesbury Reserves, joined from the Capital League
Broxbourne Borough, new club formed after Broxbourne Borough V&E folded
Wolverton Town, joined from the North Bucks League

League table

References

External links
 Spartan South Midlands Football League

2012-13
9